Josip Vrhovec (9 February 1926 – 14 February 2006) was a Croatian communist politician, best known for serving as Yugoslav Minister of Foreign Affairs between 1978 and 1982 and the Chairman of the League of Communists of Croatia (SKH, the Croatian branch of the League of Communists of Yugoslavia) from July 1982 to May 1984.

Biography
Born in Zagreb on 9 February 1926, Vrhovec first became politically engaged during World War II, during which he became a member of the Communist Party of Yugoslavia and the Yugoslav Partisans (1941–1945). After the war, Vrhovec enrolled at the University of Zagreb and graduated from the Faculty of Economics.

Upon graduation, Vrhovec started working at the Zagreb-based daily Vjesnik, where he soon became editor of the newspaper's Wednesday edition, which was at the time the company's most popular edition (he had two stints in the position, 1956–1957 and 1959–1963). He also spent several years working as Vjesnik'''s correspondent from the United Kingdom (1957–1959) and the United States (1963–1967). Upon returning to Zagreb in 1968 he was appointed chief editor at Vjesnik'', position he held until 1970 when he was replaced by Milovan Baletić.

In the late 1960s Vrhovec became more seriously involved in politics and quickly rose to high-ranking positions in the Party following the downfall of the Croatian Spring movement in the early 1970s, as a protégé of Vladimir Bakarić's faction within the League of Communists of Croatia (SKH). Between 1972 and 1974 he was a member of the SKH Central Committee and from 1974 to 1978 served as member of the Central Committee of the League of Communists of Yugoslavia (SKJ). As a member of the Central Committee he submitted a proposal to Milka Planinc to arrest and charge members of the Croatian Spring, including Franjo Tuđman, Marko Veselica, Dražen Budiša, Šime Đodan, Vlado Gotovac, and Hrvoje Šošić.

His next office was the highest point of his political career as he served as Yugoslav Minister of Foreign Affairs from May 1978 to May 1982 under Prime Minister Veselin Đuranović and during the last two years of Josip Broz Tito's reign before his death in 1980. As minister of foreign affairs, Vrhovec spent the first two years of his term accompanying Tito during his travels abroad. Following Tito's death Vrhovec was in charge of shaping Yugoslavia's foreign policy, in which he promoted the idea of improving relations with the West and opening up the country to foreign investments. He reportedly talked with Ronald Reagan several times in the early 1980s about the possibility of introducing multi-party democracy and market economy reforms in Yugoslavia. Despite this, the economic reform commission chaired by Vrhovec from 1985 to 1986 made little mention of democratization.

After serving a full four-year term, Vrhovec was appointed to the post of chairman of the League of Communists of Croatia, and from May 1984 to May 1989 he represented SR Croatia in the 9-member Presidency of Yugoslavia, a collective body functioning as head of state. In the latter half of the 1980s Vrhovec was one of the first Yugoslav politicians who were openly opposed to Slobodan Milošević's nationalist policies, at the time when Milošević's rise to power began. He was also one of the key people involved in the organisation of the 1987 Summer Universiade, the biggest sporting event hosted by Zagreb.

After his term ended, Vrhovec effectively retired from politics. Vrhovec died at the Sisters of Charity Hospital in Zagreb on 15 February 2006 and was buried at Mirogoj Cemetery in Zagreb on 21 February 2006.

References

External links

Umro Josip Vrhovec, posljednji Titov ministar vanjskih poslova 

1926 births
2006 deaths
Politicians from Zagreb
Yugoslav Partisans members
Faculty of Economics and Business, University of Zagreb alumni
League of Communists of Croatia politicians
Government ministers of Yugoslavia
Burials at Mirogoj Cemetery
Central Committee of the League of Communists of Yugoslavia members
Presidency of the Socialist Federal Republic of Yugoslavia members
Foreign ministers of Yugoslavia
Vjesnik editors